Sauze di Cesana (French: Sauze de Césane) is a comune (municipality) in the Metropolitan City of Turin in the Italian region Piedmont, located about 70 km west of Turin, on the border with France. 

Sauze di Cesana borders the following municipalities: Abriès (France), Cesana Torinese, Pragelato, Prali, and Sestriere. Within the town is the Church of San Restituto, which was a strategic location during the time of the Dauphiné. In 1065 it was mentioned for the first time in the Bull of Cuniberto, archbishop of Turin.

References

See also 
 Punta Ramiere

Cities and towns in Piedmont